Mahesh Bogahalanda (born 28 September 1979) was a Sri Lankan cricketer. He was a left-handed batsman and right-arm medium-pace bowler who played for Sri Lanka Navy. He was born in Galagegara.

Bogahalanda made a single first-class appearance for the side, during the 2000–01 season, against Galle. From the upper-middle order, he scored a single run in the first innings in which he batted, and 29 runs in the second.

Bagahalanda bowled four overs in the match, conceding 33 runs.

External links
Mahesh Bogahalanda at CricketArchive 

1979 births
Living people
Sri Lankan cricketers
Sri Lanka Navy Sports Club cricketers